Babilonia is a 1987 Argentine drama film directed and written by Jorge Salvador.

Babilonia may also refer to:

 Brian Babilonia (born 1994), Puerto Rican cyclist
 Gido Babilonia (1966-2007), Filipino basketball player
 Tai Babilonia, American figure skater

See also
 Babilônia (disambiguation)
 Babylonia (disambiguation)